The Invasion of Palawan (Filipino: Paglusob sa Palawan), was fought by U.S. liberation forces against the Japanese from 28 February to 22 April 1945, in a series of actions officially designated as Operations Victor I and II, and part of the campaign for the liberation of the Philippines during World War II, was waged to initiate the recapture of the southern islands of the Philippine archipelago, end the Japanese occupation, and secure them from remaining Japanese forces.

Background
As the elements of the U.S. Sixth Army under Lieutenant General Walter Krueger moved into the city of Manila to retake it from the well dug-in Japanese forces, General Douglas MacArthur issued orders for the start of preplanned operations to recapture the entire southern Philippine archipelago from the Japanese, all code-named VICTOR, regardless by which the assigned forces were to proceed.

With Mindoro island already in Allied hands since 16 December 1944 and the campaign for the recapture of Luzon already in full swing, the Americans wanted to establish another base of operations that would diminish the threat of Japanese troop incursions from the larger islands down south and cut off reinforcements coming from Japanese-occupied Indochina in mainland Asia via the South China Sea and the southwestern Sulu Sea.

The U.S. Eighth Army of Lt. Gen. Robert L. Eichelberger was directed to invade and seize the provincial capital of Palawan, Puerto Princesa, after which they would proceed to the Zamboanga Peninsula in western Mindanao and parts of the Sulu Archipelago.

On 10 Feb., 7 American soldiers landed on Palawan and made contact with the guerrilla network.  There they gathered intelligence on Japanese troop strength, estimated to be 1,285 soldiers, and coordinated the forthcoming troop landings.

Operation VICTOR III
The primary objectives were to complete the isolation of the central Philippine islands of Panay, Negros, Cebu and Bohol and to expand the range of Allied air operations. Aircraft based at Palawan could conduct interdiction missions as far as Indochina and cut off Japanese sea lanes in the South China Sea, while planes flying from Zamboanga and the islands in Sulu also could reach Japanese oil installations on Borneo. Gen. Eichelberger chose the 41st Infantry Division of Maj. Gen. Jens A. Doe to conduct the Palawan, Zamboanga and Sulu operations.

Like most of the Philippine Islands, Palawan was a hostile site for an invading force. Farther inland, the coastal plain gave way to heavily forested mountains that offered great defensive potential to Japanese forces. The 186th Regimental Combat Team of Brig. Gen. Harold H. Haney—the assistant 41st Division commander—was the principal combat unit entrusted by Gen. Doe to carry out the Palawan invasion.

A naval task force of cruisers and destroyers from the 7th Fleet under Vice Admiral Thomas C. Kinkaid—which was Gen. Macarthur's naval command—would protect the landing forces on their movements to shore and then remain to provide gunfire as needed. Troops and supplies would be actually carried by elements drawn from a 7th Fleet component command, the VII Amphibious Force under Rear Adm. Daniel E. Barbey. The Palawan landings were to be undertaken by the assigned amphibious task force of Rear Adm. William M. Fechteler.

Battle
After two days of punitive air strikes by the U.S. 13th Air Force and a fierce naval bombardment by 7th Fleet warships offshore, the first assault wave from the 186th Regimental Combat Team began moving ashore at Puerto Princesa on the morning of 28 February, under the eyes of Gen. Eichelberger, who watched from a B-17 heavy bomber flying overhead.

As expected, the absence of suitable landing areas slowed the largely unopposed unloading operation, but the process would have been even slower if not for the outstanding efficiency of the Army Shore Party and Boat Company from the 2nd Engineer Special Brigade, units who ably supervised and managed the movement of troops and supplies at the beach landings.

The men of the 186th RCT quickly fanned out, with two battalions striking north along the eastern side of Puerto Princesa Harbor while a third battalion crossed the bay at its midpoint and then pushed north, but then as the first day progressed, it became clear to the invading American troops that the Japanese troops—holdovers from Lt. Gen. Sōsaku Suzuki's 35th Army—would not put up a fight at Puerto Princesa and had withdrawn into the hills to the northwest.

More disturbing was the revelation of a massacre of approximately 150 American prisoners of war the previous December. The presence of a passing Allied convoy made the alarmed Japanese believe that an invasion was imminent and had herded their prisoners into air-raid shelters, subsequently setting the shelters afire and shooting prisoners who tried to escape. A few men miraculously survived immolation and escaped the shooting. Sheltered by natives until the Americans landed, they emerged during the battle to tell their horrifying tale, which only hardened American resolve to end Japanese rule over the island.

Five days of savage combat eliminated the strongly defended Japanese pockets. In the weeks that followed, Gen. Eichelberger also directed smaller units of the 186th RCT to seize the small islands situated to the northern and southern parts of Palawan. On 9 March, a 186th RCT reconnaissance team landed on Dumaran Island to the northeast of Palawan and found it unoccupied. Then on 9 April a month later, Company F, 186th Infantry, landed on Busuanga Island, killed 10 Japanese, and reported the island secured. Subsequently, the regiment also seized nearby Culion and Coron. To the south, parties from the 2nd Battalion landed on Balabac on 16 April and at Pandanan on 22 April. Both landings were unopposed.

Aftermath
Casualties on Palawan were unbalanced. U.S. Army forces lost 12 killed and 56 wounded, while Japanese dead numbered almost 900 and another 140 wounded, which were approximately ½ of the Palawan garrison.

Mopping up activities on Palawan lasted until late April, when the remaining Japanese simply withdrew farther into the trackless mountain jungles of Palawan—a pattern that repeated during all of the major operations in the southern Philippines—after which many were stalked and killed by U.S. troops and Filipino guerrillas.

Meanwhile, airfield construction began almost immediately on Palawan. Although marshy soil conditions slowed the engineers' progress, American fighter planes were using the Puerto Princesa airstrip by late March 1945. Construction of an all-weather runway for heavy bombers came too late to support Eichelberger's next operation, but it subsequently was used to interdict Japanese supply lines in the South China Sea and support the Borneo operations that began in May 1945.

See also
Palawan massacre
Military History of the Philippines during World War II
Military history of the United States
Military history of Japan
History of the Philippines

References

Triumph in the Philippines by Robert Ross Smith (2005), Honolulu: University Press of the Pacific, pp. 589–591
World War II in the Pacific: An Encyclopedia (Military History of the United States) by S. Sandler (2000) Routledge

Further reading

Palawan
Palawan
1945 in the Philippines
History of Palawan
Palawan
Palawan
February 1945 events in Asia
March 1945 events in Asia
April 1945 events in Asia

ja:ビサヤ諸島の戦い#パラワン島